Deborah Denise Avant (born November 26, 1958) is an American political scientist and faculty member at the University of Denver's Josef Korbel School of International Studies. Avant is also the Director of the university's Sie Cheou-Kang Center for International Security and Diplomacy and the president of the International Studies Association.

Education
Avant received her B.A., M.A. and Ph.D. at the University of California, San Diego. She previously taught at the George Washington University and then the University of California, Irvine until 2011 where she was the Director of International Studies and the Center for Research on International and Global Studies (RIGS), Political Science School of Social Sciences. Avant jointed the University of Denver faculty in 2011 when she was named the inaugural holder of the Sie Cheou-Kang Center for International Security and Diplomacy Endowed Chair. In 2022-2023, she served as the president of the International Studies Association.

Bibliography

Books
The New Power Politics: Networks and Security Governance (co-edited with Oliver Westerwinter)
Who Governs the Globe? (co-edited with Martha Finnemore and Susan Sell)
The Market for Force: The Consequences of Privatizing Security
Political Institutions and Military Change: Lessons from Peripheral Wars

References

External links
Faculty Page, University of Denver
Deborah Avant Publications, University of Denver

1958 births
Living people
University of Denver faculty
University of California, San Diego alumni
University of California, Irvine faculty
Josef Korbel School of International Studies people
American women political scientists
American political scientists
American women academics
21st-century American women